Viktoras Muntianas (born 11 November 1951 in Marijampolė, Lithuanian SSR) is a Lithuanian politician of Moldovan descent and former Speaker of the Seimas. In 1968 he graduated from the high school in Marijampolė. In 1973 he enrolled in the Vilnius Civil Engineering Institute, completing his studies in 1978. Between 1986 and 1990 he was first deputy of Kėdainiai municipality  chairman. Later he started a career in business, becoming manager of Ūkio bankas filial in Kėdainiai in 1994. After two years he became vice-president of Vikonda concern.

Soon afterwards Muntianas renewed his political career. On 1997 he became mayor of Kėdainiai; in 2004 he was elected to the Seimas. Muntianas was Speaker of the Seimas from 2006 until resigning on 1 April 2008.

In November 2008 he and his aides were implicated in the Case of Drąsius Kedys pedophile scandal.

References

 Biography of Viktoras Muntianas. Seimas (Parliament) of Lithuania.
  Naujajam parlamento vadovui ankstesniojo kėdėje gerai. Kauno diena.

1951 births
Living people
People from Marijampolė
Lithuanian people of Moldovan descent
Speakers of the Seimas
Vilnius Gediminas Technical University alumni
Communist Party of Lithuania politicians
Lithuanian Peasants Party politicians
New Union (Social Liberals) politicians
Labour Party (Lithuania) politicians
Civic Democratic Party (Lithuania) politicians
21st-century Lithuanian politicians